Traverse City Area Public Schools (TCAPS) is a public school district based in Traverse City, Michigan, United States. This district includes 10 elementary schools, 2 middle schools, 2 high schools, 1 alternative high school, and 1 Montessori school. The district is headquartered in the Boardman Building, a former elementary school. In 2017, Traverse City Central and West High Schools were named among the most challenging in the country. The district serves as the second-largest employer in the city of Traverse City. As of 2017, TCAPS was the 18th largest school district in Michigan by enrollment.

The district encompasses about half of Grand Traverse County, as well as southeastern Leelanau County and a few square miles of eastern Benzie County.

History

Traverse City's first public school district was founded in 1871 when Boardman, Central, Elmwood Avenue, Oak Park, and Union Street Independent Schools united. Today, all of these schools are closed, but Boardman, Central and Union Street school buildings are used for other purposes. Since 1871, many other schools around the area have been annexed and built.

In 1997, because of overcrowding at Traverse City Senior High School (TCSHS), which had since become the largest high school in Michigan, a second high school was built, and opened in early 1998. The new high school became Traverse City West Senior High School, and the former TCSHS became Traverse City Central High School. This succeeded the split of Traverse City Junior High School into Traverse City West Junior High and East Junior High in 1992.

In the mid-2000s, due to dwindling attendance, five elementary schools closed their doors: Bertha Vos, Glenn Loomis, Norris, Oak Park, and Sabin Elementary schools. Also, up until the 2009–10 school year, elementary schools in the district had grades K-6, junior high schools had 7–9, and senior highs had 10–12. However, at the beginning of this school year, the 6th grade class was moved to the junior highs (renamed middle schools), and the freshman class was moved to the senior high schools.

In 2011, the original Long Lake Elementary closed to be rebuilt nearby. This was the first time since 1997 that the district had opened a new building.

In March 2016, TCAPS decided to close Bertha Vos International School and Interlochen Community. Officials almost closed Old Mission Elementary School, but an unknown donor has pledged to pay about $100,000 dollars to keep it open. In May 2016, the nearby Kingsley Area Schools decided to look into purchasing the Interlochen. For both 2015 and 2016 the TCAPS Japanese exchange program, in which TCAPS students exchange with Japanese ones for one week, has been completely paid for by an anonymous donor.

In May 2017, Eastern Elementary closed for a rebuild, similar to the rebuild of Long Lake Elementary six years prior. The project lasted the entire 2017/18 school year, and was completed in summer of 2018. The students were moved to the nearby vacant Bertha Vos, which closed the previous year. This project costed around $10 million. Also in 2017, a Traverse City food company called Food for Thought bought the vacant Long Lake Elementary School building, which was used as an elementary school before 2011. The company remodeled the elementary building into a warehouse.

In 2018, TCAPS has three vacant properties around the Traverse City Area. It is unknown if these properties are to become schools, but TCAPS has expressed feelings of building a new district headquarters, replacing the old Boardman Building in Traverse City. Also in 2018, Old Mission School became an independent district, further lowering the number of elementary schools in the district.

In 2019, Paul Soma retired as superintendent of TCAPS, and Ann Cardon took over. However, that October, Cardon resigned, due to tension between her and the school board. Former superintendent Jim Pavelka took the position of interim superintendent. On May 20, 2020, Dr. John VanWagoner, former superintendent of Alpena Public Schools, was elected to become the next superintendent. VanWagoner was elected by the board 7–0 over Denise Herrmann, former superintendent of the Roseville Joint Union High School District in Roseville, California. VanWagoner was officially hired in June 2020.

Also in 2019, TCAPS announced they wanted to rebuild their Montessori school at the old Glenn Loomis Elementary, set to open in the 2021–2022 school year. Proposed locations included east of Thirlby Field, its current location west of Thirlby Field, or on Franke Road near Meijer. In January 2020, TCAPS voted to build on the Franke Road location, and reopen Glenn Loomis as a standard elementary school. This succeeds a number of school rebuilds and remodels around the area, including the building of remodeled front entrances at Courtade, Willow Hill, Silver Lake Elementary schools, as well as West Middle School, during summer of 2019, and Westwoods and Blair in 2020. Blair, Silver Lake, and Westwoods Elementary schools had also been expanded in the previous years to accommodate a higher number of students.

COVID-19 pandemic
Due to the COVID-19 pandemic, with the announcement of three cases in Michigan, as well as other schools in Michigan closing, TCAPS announced they would stay open, for the best of the parents. However, Governor Gretchen Whitmer announced the closure of all K-12 districts until April 6, 2020. On April 2 of that year, the rest of the 2019–2020 school year was cancelled. The first two weeks of the 2020–21 school year began on September 8 with online schooling. Following this, the district went back to in-person schooling.

Later in the year, on October 20, TCAPS reported that a staff member at Traverse City Central High School had contracted COVID-19. The next two days, a Wednesday and Thursday, would see Central students revert to online classes while the Grand Traverse County Health Department conducted contact tracing, with the following Friday seeing students return to in-school learning. However, other TCAPS schools, including Traverse City West Senior High School, would remain open. On Sunday, November 8, TCAPS announced cases at West Senior High, and announced that that school would be closed the following day. However, the next day, another case was announced, and TCAPS closed west again for the next day. On Tuesday, November 10, TCAPS announced they would be closing both high schools, as well as both middle schools, for the rest of the week, while all elementary schools would remain open. On Friday, November 13, TCAPS extended this second shutdown for the whole of the next week too. Two days later, the Michigan Department of Health and Human Services ordered all high schools resort to online learning once again, while leaving all K-8 schools open with restrictions. An additional two weeks in April 2021 saw the middle and high schools close due to Michigan's rapid rise in COVID cases.

Racist group chat incident
In April 2021, TCAPS revealed that some high school students (at both Central and West) were involved in a Snapchat group called "Slave Trade", in which pictures of African American students were posted and assigned price tags. Screenshots showed messages such as "All Blacks should die" and "Let's have another Holocaust". TCAPS, as well as the Grand Traverse County Sheriff's Department both conducted investigations at both high schools.

Board of Education 
The following table lists members of the current TCAPS Board of Education (as of 2023):

Schools

High schools
TCAPS offers two comprehensive high schools, serving grades 9 through 12. In addition, the district offers alternative high school education.

Central High School 

Traverse City Central High School is Traverse City's oldest high school. Originally opened in 1853, the school is changed names and locations a multitude of times. Its current location was opened in 1959. In 1997, the school, which had previously been named Traverse City Senior High School, changed names to Traverse City Central High School, after the original senior high school split to form West Senior High. Its athletic teams are known as the Trojans. The school's current principal is Jessie Houghton, and enrolls about 1,450 students.

West Senior High School

Traverse City West Senior High School is Traverse City's second comprehensive high school. It was opened in 1997 after overcrowding at the former Traverse City Senior High School. Since 2014, the school's principal has been Joe Esper, who took over from Joseph Tibaldi. It enrolls about 1,540 students, making it the largest high school in Michigan north of Kent County. Its athletic teams are known as the Titans.

Traverse City High School
TCAPS offers alternative education at Traverse City High School. The school is located on Three Mile Road at the site of the former East Bay Elementary School. Despite having no athletic teams, the school's students are referred to as the "Mavericks". Its principal is Lance Morgan.

Middle schools
TCAPS has two middle schools, serving grades 6, 7 and 8.

East Middle School
Traverse City East Middle School is Traverse City's public middle school serving Traverse City's east side. Because of it serving as a feeder to Central High School, East Middle's athletic teams are also known as the Trojans. It is located off Three Mile Road, on the same campus as Cherry Knoll Elementary School. The school was opened in 1992 to relieve crowding at the former Traverse City Junior High School. The school's current principal is Dan Tiesworth, and enrolls about 800 students.

West Middle School
Traverse City West Middle School is Traverse City's public middle school serving Traverse City's west side. The school's athletic teams are known as the Titans, as the school serves as a feeder to West Senior High School. The school is located off Silver Lake Road, on grounds formerly used for agriculture by the Traverse City State Hospital. The school, formerly known as Traverse City Junior High School, was formerly located in what is now Central Grade School, but was located outside of the city to its current locale in the 1970s. In the 1990s, the original middle school was split into East and West Middle Schools. The school's current principal is Terry Smith, and enrolls about 1,090 students.

Elementary schools
TCAPS offers 10 standard elementary schools, serving grades prekindergarten through 5. In addition, the district offers a K-8 montessori school.

Closed elementary schools

Other facilities
TCAPS utilizes Northwest Educational Services facilities for other forms of education. The Northwest Educational Services Career Tech is a technological education center used by West and Central High Schools. Oak Park school (former Oak Park Elementary), also owned by Northwest Educational Services, is used as a special education school

Athletic facilities
Thirlby Field in Traverse City, which seats 9000, serves as a neutral ground between the athletic teams on Traverse City's west and east sides. The stadium is used by both Traverse City West and Central, as well as St. Francis High School, as a home field for football, soccer, and lacrosse. Both high schools also use Howe Arena and Centre Ice Arena for ice hockey and figure skating. The Grand Traverse Bay YMCA complexes are used for swim meets. Both high schools in the district, as well as middle schools, have their own football fields, used for smaller football games, as well as track and field. These schools also have their own baseball, softball, and tennis court complexes.

Gallery

See also

 List of high schools in Michigan
 Education in Michigan

References

External links 
 

School districts in Michigan
Education in Benzie County, Michigan
Education in Grand Traverse County, Michigan
Education in Leelanau County, Michigan
Traverse City, Michigan
1871 establishments in Michigan
School districts established in 1871
Traverse City Central-Traverse City West Rivalry